is the capital city of Miyazaki Prefecture on the island of Kyushu in Japan. The city was founded on April 1, 1924. As of July 2022, the city had an estimated population of 399,788 and a population density of 621 persons per km2. The total area is 643.67 km2.

Miyazaki Airport and Miyazaki seaport serve the city.

History
In 1870, Hyuga Province was renamed to Miyazaki Prefecture with Miyazaki being its capital. After the completion of the nationwide railroad system, many new people began to settle in the area.

In 1940, the imperialist Shōwa regime constructed the 37 meter Hakkō Ichiu pillar upon the legendary site of Emperor Jimmu's palace.  Located near Miyazaki, it was originally intended to symbolize the divine right of the Empire of Japan to "unify the eight corners of the world". The tower survived the war and is now the centerpiece of the Heiwadai-koen peace park.

On January 1, 2006, the towns of Sadowara and Tano (both from Miyazaki District), and the town of Takaoka (from Higashimorokata District) were merged into Miyazaki.

On March 23, 2010, the town of Kiyotake (from Miyazaki District) was merged into Miyazaki. Miyazaki District was dissolved as a result of this merger.

Geography

Climate
Miyazaki has a humid subtropical climate with hot, humid summers and cool winters.

Surrounding municipalities 
Miyazaki Prefecture

 Miyakonojō
 Nichinan
 Saito
 Kobayashi
 Kunitomi
 Aya
Shintomi
 Mimiata

Demographics
Per Japanese census data, the population of Miyazaki in 2020 is 401,339 people. Miyazaki has been conducting censuses since 1920.

Economy
Skynet Asia Airways has its headquarters in Miyazaki. Asiana Airlines operates a sales office on the sixth floor of the Miyazaki Daiichi Seimei Building in Miyazaki.
Dell Inc has their two call centers in Japan then had opened the one on the 5th floor of Carino Miyazaki Building in Miyazaki.

Points of interest
 Miyazaki Prefectural Office became famous as a tourist spot when Hideo Higashikokubaru, a national celebrity, became the prefectural governor of Miyazaki.
 Miyazaki-jingū, a shrine in the city's center, is one of Miyazaki's sacred dedications to Japan's first emperor, Jinmu.
 Heiwadai Tower or "Peace Tower" (also known as the Hakkō ichiu monument), in the expansive Heiwadai Park, is a must-see for tourists. Originally the "Tower of the Emperor," symbolizing Japanese imperial expansion, it was renamed for peace after the events of World War II.
 Aoshima Island and shrine boasts some rare rock formations known as the Devil's Washboard among a peaceful beach setting, and it is a popular relaxation and play destination for locals and travelers alike. The Aoshima Subtropical Botanical Garden is also located nearby and is free to the public, including their greenhouse which features colorful lighting during some summer evenings.
 The Tom Watson Golf Course was produced by Tom Watson, an American professional golfer.
 Phoenix Zoo is a combination live animal zoo and child-centered amusement park.
 The Citizen's Forest is a large park near the Phoenix Zoo. Located on its grounds is the Misogi-ike, Pond of Purification, that is the birthplace of the sun goddess Amaterasu according to legend.
 The Ikime Burial Mounds are located in Miyazaki and include the Ikime-no-mori Yukokan, Activity Centre, where visitors learn the history of the burial mounds and learn about ancient activities.
 Miyazaki City is known for its excellent surfing conditions year-round. Kisakihama Beach, Aoshima Beach, and Shirahama Beach are popular surfing spots all within the city limits.
 Kaeda Valley is a free public park and natural reserve featuring walking paths and hiking trails (various difficulty levels and estimated times to completion). Kaeda is a forested area with a river running through it.
 The Kirishima Sports Complex consists of various athletic facilities, such as running trails, a stadium, tennis courts, an outdoor ropes course, etc. as well as some indoor meeting space. The complex hosts various sports games/matches and events throughout the year, including the Aoshima Taiheiyo Marathon.
 Miyazaki Mango is a world famous species that looks like the rising sun. Also known as the Sun Egg is used for gifting.
 Florante Miyazaki is a botanical park that features floral displays and a popular winter lights display.
 Aeon Mall Miyazaki offers retail stores, restaurants, a grocery store, and a cinema.

Transportation
The JR Kyushu Nichinan Line serves the area.

The Miyakoh Bus Company operates buses through Miyazaki City and surrounding towns. Website is available only in Japanese.

The trains and buses accept payment through any IC card, however, some JR lines, such as the Nichinan Line, only accept cash.

The city is served by Miyazaki Airport.

Twin towns – sister cities
Miyazaki has five sister cities:

National
  Kashihara, Nara (since February 11, 1966)
  Tano, Kōchi (since July 8, 1989)
  Daisen, Akita (since June 3, 2001)

International
  Waukegan, Illinois, United States, since May 3, 1990
  Virginia Beach, Virginia, United States, since May 25, 1992
  Boeun County, North Chungcheong, South Korea, since August 6, 1993
  Huludao, Liaoning, China, since May 16, 2004

Notable people 

 Yui Asaka (singer and actress)
 Sky Brown (skateboarder) 
 Shinzo Koroki (soccer player)
 Kosei Inoue (judoka)
 Ryunosuke Haga (judoka)
 Kawaguchi Yurina (singer, former member of X21)

Education
University of Miyazaki
Miyazaki Prefectural Nursing University
Miyazaki Municipal University
Miyazaki Sangyo-keiei University
Minami Kyushu University
Miyazaki International College
Minami Kyushu Junior College

References

External links

 

 
Cities in Miyazaki Prefecture
Port settlements in Japan